Elias Karam (born 1960) is an Assyrian singer from Syria, born in the city of Al-Hasakah in the Northeastern governorate of Al-Hasakah.

Biography
Elias was born Syria in the Northeastern governorate of Al-Hasakah. He learned playing Oud from his father and was inspired by Wadih El Safi at a young age, prompting him to write his first song at 16. After turning professional at the age of 20, Elias started composing music. His wrote the song ‘Amari, Tarab ya kalbi and Koullon ‘anak saalouni. Elias has toured all over the Arab world, Canada, United States, and a number of European countries. He also appeared in some TV series in Syria.

References

People from Al-Hasakah
20th-century Syrian male singers
Syrian Christians
Syrian composers
1960 births
Living people
Syriac-language singers
Syrian people of Assyrian descent
Assyrian/Syriac Syrians
21st-century Syrian male singers